Ricardo Neumann Bertín (born 12 December 1987) is a Chilean lawyer who was elected as a member of the Chilean Constitutional Convention.

He was CEO of the Fundación para el Progreso (FPP).

See also
 List of members of the Chilean Constitutional Convention

References

External links
 

Living people
1988 births
21st-century Chilean lawyers
21st-century Chilean politicians
Independent Democratic Union politicians
Members of the Chilean Constitutional Convention
Pontifical Catholic University of Chile alumni
Columbia University alumni